The South Carolina Warriors were a semi-professional basketball team based in Myrtle Beach, South Carolina. It was an expansion franchise team of the American Basketball Association in the Mid-Atlantic Conference. The team began play in the 2011–12 season.

Team history
In early August 2011, The American Basketball Association (ABA) announced that it has added the South Carolina Warriors, an expansion team in Myrtle Beach, South Carolina, for its 2011–2012 season. The South Carolina Warriors would be owned by Indianapolis-based Platinum Entertainment Group LLC/Dymond Recodz (PEG) and would have its first home game at the Myrtle Beach Convention Center.

On November 24, 2011, the team announced that starting December 3, 2011, all of the team's home games would be played at the Little River Recreation Center.

On February 25, 2012, the team was sold. It had been owned and operated by Tony Bennett through two different companies. It was sold to a couple investors in South Carolina.

In their inaugural season, The Warriors won every game in the regular season, then beat the Carolina Cheetahs in the playoffs, Lynchburg Legends in the Mid Atlantic Championship, Connecticut Topballers in the ABA Elite Eight, the North Dallas Vandals and Jacksonville Giants for a 29–0 record before losing 2–0 in a best-of-three series to the Jacksonville Giants in the ABA finals.

On October 28, 2012, it was announced that the Warriors had been sold again. Its new owners were local businessmen Leonard R. Watts and J. Marshall Biddle. John Kefalas was promoted from being an assistant to head coach after Chris Beard, the head coach for the inaugural season, left to pursue other coaching opportunities, eventually becoming the head coach at the University of Texas. Kefalas was an assistant coach at Coastal Carolina under Pete Strickland.

2012–13 season schedule
Regular Season: 17–1 (Home: 16–0 | Away: 2–1)
Cancelled Games:  5 (By other teams due to technicalities)
In the results column, the first score listed is the Warriors.

Season-by-season record

Head coaches

2012–13 roster and former players

Awards received

References

External links
Official website

Defunct American Basketball Association (2000–present) teams
Basketball teams in South Carolina
Sports in Myrtle Beach, South Carolina
Basketball teams established in 2011
2011 establishments in South Carolina